How to Change the World is a documentary film from writer-director Jerry Rothwell (Deep Water) about a group of young activists who intend to stop Richard Nixon's nuclear bomb tests in Amchitka, Alaska, and who eventually create the worldwide green movement with the foundation of Greenpeace.

Synopsis
In 1971, a small group of activists sailed from Vancouver, Canada in a fishing boat. to try to stop Nixon's atomic test bomb in Amchitka, Alaska. The film centers on activist Robert Hunter and his part in the creation of Greenpeace, which is structured by the five rules of engagement from Hunter's writings.

Cast
 Barry Pepper as the voice of Bob Hunter, serving as narrator
 Bill Darnel
 David Garrick
 Bobbi Hunter
 Emily Hunter
 Will Jackson
 George Korotva
 Myron McDonald
 Rod Marining
 Patrick Moore
 Ron Precious
 Paul Spong
 Carlie Truman
 Paul Watson
 Rex Weyler

Release and marketing
The documentary first premiered at the 2015 Sundance Film Festival, winning the World Cinema Documentary Special Jury Award for Editing and the Candescent Award. A first trailer was released on July 30, 2015.

On September 9, 2015, Picturehouse screened the documentary in 120 U.K. and 70 U.S. cinemas, (presented with Fathom Events stateside), followed by a satellite Q&A with Rothwell, fashion designer and Greenpeace supporter Vivienne Westwood and daughter of the first president of Greenpeace, Emily Hunter.

Reception
The film received positive reviews. The review aggregator website Rotten Tomatoes reported an 86% approval rating, with a rating average of 8/10.

Dennis Harvey praised the film in Variety noting, "The goldmine of 16mm color footage, whose propagandic value participants were quite cognizant of at the time, is in mint condition, showing the excitement and fun of the movement in its earliest days." Kate Taylor from The Globe and Mail gave the film 3 out of 4 stars, adding that "Whatever you think of Greenpeace's less well-considered antics over the years, How to Change the World is a compelling story of one environmentalist's remarkable combination of prescience, grit and timing." The Toronto Star wrote "Almost a "found footage" movie, it makes excellent use of 1,500 archived 16 mm reels supplemented with fresh interviews and some animation."

Accolades
The film has received various accolades such as those listed below.

References

External links
 How to Change the World Official Website
 
 
 

2015 films
Documentary films about environmental issues
Documentary films about historical events
Greenpeace
Films about activists
English-language Canadian films
Films scored by Lesley Barber
2015 documentary films
Canadian documentary films
2010s English-language films
2010s Canadian films
English-language documentary films